Allie Beth Stuckey (born 1992), American political commentator
 Andy Stuckey, of Stuckey and Murray, US comedy music duo, performing 2001-8
 Bruce Stuckey (born 1947), English footballer
 Chansi Stuckey (born 1983), a US American football player for the Arizona Cardinals
 Darrell Stuckey (born 1987), US American football player
 Elizabeth Stuckey-French (born 1958), US author
 Elma Stuckey (1907–1988), US African American poet
 George Stuckey (1871–1932), Australian rules footballer
 Henry Stuckey (born 1950), US American football player
 Hugh Stuckey (1928–2018), Australian entertainment writer
 James Stuckey, US real estate developer, active 2007 to 2011
 Jann Stuckey (born 1955), Australian politician
 Jim Stuckey (born 1958), US American football player
 Lyn Stuckey (born 1978), US performer, works with Australian children's performing group The Wiggles
 Maurice Stuckey (born 1990), German basketball player
 Nat Stuckey (1933–1988), US country singer.
 Peter Stuckey (born 1940), English cricketer
 Rodney Stuckey (born 1986), US basketball player
 Scott Stuckey (born 1964), US filmmaker
 Shawn Stuckey (born 1975), US American football player
 Sophie Stuckey (born 1991), English actress
 Sterling Stuckey (1932–2018), US historian
 Will Stuckey (1873–1928), Australian rules footballer
 W.S. Stuckey, Jr. (born 1935), US businessperson & politician
 W. S. Stuckey, Sr. (1909–1977), US businessperson

See also
 Steven Stucky (1949–2016), US composer
Stuckley
Stukeley
Stucki

Surnames
English-language surnames
Surnames of English origin
Surnames of British Isles origin